Arousal Disasters is Jonathan Seet's second album, released by Aporia Records/MapleNationwide on 14 February 2003.

Track listing
 "À Bientôt" – 3:48
 "Cyanide Tooth " – 5:34
 "Dirty Glass " – 3:20
 "14 Candles" – 4:27
 "Echo" – 3:23
 "The Dead Ballet" – 4:54
 "Light The Sky " – 3:31
 "Smoke " – 4:18
 "Tilt" – 5:24
 "Cover Me" – 3:57
 "Nasty Little Boys" – 7:17

Jonathan Seet albums
2003 albums